Robert Blake Johnson is an American politician serving as a member of the Indiana House of Representatives from the 100th district. He was appointed to the House on July 10, 2020.

Early life and education 
Johnson earned a Bachelor of Arts degree in political science and communications from Eckerd College and a Master of Arts in teaching from Marian University.

Career 
In 2009 and 2010, Johnson worked as a communications advisor and speechwriter for Sue Errington's successful state senate campaign. From 2009 to 2011, he worked as a teacher with Teach For America. In 2011, he was the director of communications for the Marion County Democratic Party. From 2011 to 2013, he served as communications director and senior advisor for Congressman André Carson. He joined Complete College America in 2013, working as the organization's communications director until 2017 and vice president of strategy until 2018. He represented the 12th district on the Indianapolis City-County Council from 2016 to 2020. Since 2018, he has been the president and CEO of IndyHub. Johnson was appointed to the Indiana House of Representatives in July 2020. He also serves as ranking member of the House Local Government Committee.

References 

Living people
Eckerd College alumni
Marian University (Indiana) alumni
Democratic Party members of the Indiana House of Representatives
Politicians from Indianapolis
Indianapolis City-County Council members
Year of birth missing (living people)
Teach For America alumni